The Vinschgau, Vintschgau or Vinschgau Valley (medieval toponym: Finsgowe) is the upper part of the Adige or Etsch river valley, in the western part of the province of South Tyrol, Italy.

Etymology
The German name Vinschgau, like Italian Val Venosta, is derived from the Celtic (Rhaetian) Venostes tribes mentioned on the ancient Tropaeum Alpium. A Frankish Gau was established under Charlemagne in 772; it was first mentioned in a 1077 deed, when King Henry IV of Germany granted the estates of Schlanders in pago Finsgowe to Bishop Altwin of Brixen.

Geography

The Vinschgau Valley runs in a west-east orientation, from the Merano basin at Partschins up the Adige river to Reschen Pass in the northwest. The Ötztal Alps in the north, part of the Alpine crest, separate it from the upper Inn Valley. The Adige valley is further confined by the Sesvenna Alps in the west and the Ortler Alps in the south. It comprises several side valleys, such as the Suldental, the Matscher Tal, or the Schnalstal.

Due to the insular location within the Central Eastern Alps, a rather warm climate and a lack of rain (400mm per year), fields, meadows and apple orchards are irrigated. Viticulture is also common.

According to the 2001 census, 96.51% of the population of the valley speak German, 3.41% Italian and 0.08% Ladin as first language.

Subdivision
The Vinschgau District was established in 1962. The district covers the largest part of the Vinschgau region and its side valleys, in which 13 municipalities cooperate:

Kastelbell-Tschars (Castelbello-Ciardes) 
Graun im Vinschgau (Curon Venosta) 
Glurns (Glorenza) 
Latsch (Laces) 
Laas (Lasa)
Mals (Malles Venosta) 
Martell (Martello)
Prad am Stilfser Joch (Prato allo Stelvio) 
Schlanders (Silandro) 
Schluderns (Sluderno) 
Schnals (Senales) 
Stilfs (Stelvio)
Taufers im Münstertal (Tubre) 

The municipalities of Naturns (Naturno), Plaus and Partschins (Parcines) geographically belong to the lower Vinschgau region, though politically they are affiliated with the neighbouring Burggrafenamt district.

References

External links

 Vinschgau District 

Districts of South Tyrol